Bobby Cheng (born 20 March 1997) is a Chinese-Australian chess player. He was awarded the title of Grandmaster by FIDE in 2019. Cheng was world champion in the under 12 category in 2009, the only Australian in history to win a world title. Cheng won Australian Open championship in 2013 and Australian chess Championship in 2016.

Biography and career
Cheng was born in Hamilton, New Zealand. His early trainers in New Zealand were Bruce Wheeler and Ewen Green, followed by GM Darryl Johansen after Cheng arrived in Australia.

He finished tied for third place in the Under 10 division of the World Youth Chess Championships in 2007, the year he and his family moved to Melbourne, Australia. In November 2009, Cheng transferred national federations from New Zealand to Australia and won the Under 12 title at the World Youth Championships in Kemer, Turkey.

Cheng won the Australian Junior Championship in January 2010, at age 12, becoming the youngest player ever to do so, and won the same title again in 2011. Also in 2011, Cheng became the youngest ever winner of the Victorian Championship title, finishing ahead of Grandmaster Darryl Johansen. In 2012 Cheng tied for the Australian Masters title with Anton Smirnov. He played for the Australian team in the World Youth Under-16 Chess Olympiad in 2012 and 2013.

In January 2013 Cheng won the Australian Open Championship, the youngest player ever to do so. In January 2016, Cheng became the Australian champion in Melbourne. In 2018, he played on the Australian national team in the 43rd Chess Olympiad in Batumi, Georgia.

In December 2019 Cheng won the Australian Young Masters tournament with a perfect 9/9 score, ahead of top seed Norwegian Grandmaster Frode Urkedal.

In July 2021, Cheng was invited to the FIDE World Cup in Sochi. He was the first Australian in history to win a game in the World Cup after defeating GM Vahap Sanal from Turkey in the rapid tiebreaks. In round 2 he received a walk over against GM Levon Aronian after the former world number 2 had to forfeit his match due to displaying flu like symptoms. Cheng subsequently bowed out against the former Belarusian champion GM Vladislav Kovalev 1.5-0.5.

References

External links

Bobby Cheng chess games at 365Chess.com

Bobby Cheng team chess record at Olimpbase.org

1997 births
Living people
Chess grandmasters
Australian chess players
New Zealand chess players
World Youth Chess Champions
Chess Olympiad competitors
Australian people of Chinese descent
New Zealand people of Chinese descent
New Zealand emigrants to Australia
Sportspeople from Hamilton, New Zealand